Gender and Research (Czech title: Gender a výzkum) is a biannual peer-reviewed academic journal published by the Institute of Sociology of the Czech Academy of Sciences. It is a transdisciplinary journal with a focus on feminist theory and gender studies. The journal was established in 2000 as Gender, rovné příležitosti, výzkum/Gender and Research. The journal focusses on Central and Eastern Europe as well as other global macro-regions. Articles are published in Czech, Slovak, or English. The journal publishes scientific articles, essays, book reviews, scholarly interviews, and conference news. The editor-in-chief is Zuzana Uhde (Czech Academy of Sciences). The journal is abstracted and indexed in Scopus and other databases. It is an open access journal listed in the DOAJ.

References

External links

Gender studies journals
Publications established in 2000